WUVM-LD, virtual channel 4 (VHF digital 2), is a low-powered Estrella TV-affiliated television station licensed to Atlanta, Georgia, United States. On Cable, this station is available only in standard definition on Charter Spectrum channel 210, and Comcast Xfinity channel 15. It is one of the few LPTV stations in the country to be seen on satellite TV (since must-carry does not apply to them), as it is part of DirecTV's local lineup. The city of license is Atlanta, but the very directional antenna is aimed northwest and west from the North Druid Hills area, also covering most of Cobb County. It goes as far as Roswell in the north, Marietta to the northwest, and Lithia Springs to the west.

The WUVM-LD antenna is on the same radio tower, north of Druid Hills, with several other stations: W13DQ-D, WATL TV 25 (36.1), and WANF TV 19 (46.1). FM stations on the same tower are WWWQ FM 99.7, WRFG FM 89.3, and WKHX-FM 101.5. The tower is located just northwest of the intersection of Briarcliff Road and Clifton Road, near Emory University and the Centers for Disease Control.

History
Originally W20AU on channel 20, it became W04DB on channel 4 due to the FCC assignment of WTBS (channel 17, now WPCH-TV) to digital channel 20.

Carrying ShopNBC until early 2006, it now carries Azteca America.

It was formerly licensed to VVILPTV Inc. before being transferred to Scott Saldana's ownership; it was later sold to the L4 Media Group of Melbourne, Florida. In July 2006, L4 Media Group agreed to sell WUVM-LP to Una Vez Mas Holdings, LLC for $1.45 million.

WUVM-LP was issued a construction permit for a digital signal on channel 8 on April 11, 2018. On January 14, 2021, the callsign changed to WUVM-LD, with digital operation beginning on channel 2.

Subchannels

References

External links

FCC map of WUVM-LD coverage

UVM-LD
Television channels and stations established in 1998
Spanish-language television stations in Georgia (U.S. state)
Innovate Corp.